Ardh Satya is a 1983 film directed by Govind Nihalani, his second offering after another angst-ridden movie Aakrosh (1980). The screenplay of both movies was by Vijay Tendulkar, the noted Marathi playwright; this one was based on the short story, 'Surya', by S. D. Panvalkar, and featured dialogues by Vasant Dev.

In this acclaimed cop-drama, the protagonist, played by Om Puri, is a policeman struggling with the evils around him and with his own frailties. The film also stars Amrish Puri, Smita Patil, Naseeruddin Shah, and Sadashiv Amrapurkar, and features a theme poem by the Marathi writer Dilip Chitre. Nihalani was looking for a new actor to play the role of Rama Shetty when writer Tendulkar convinced him to see the play of Amrapurkar. It was a Marathi play called "Hands Up". The title of the film came from a poem written by Dilip Chitre.

Ardh Satya won many awards and went on to become a landmark film in Indian film history. It is still considered to be one of the best cop films made in India. A sequel titled Party was released in 1984. The movie was remade in Tamil as Kaaval.

Plot

The film opens at a party where Anant Welankar (Om Puri), a police officer, meets Jyotsna Gokhale (Smita Patil), a lecturer in literature at a local college. Anant is a sub-inspector with Bombay police. They seem to hit it off despite some initial skirmishing about ideology, and the friendship blossoms into a relationship.

Anant brings diligence, enthusiasm and a definite idealism to his job. But the job is harsh. There is a deep nexus between the local mafia, the cops and the (corrupt) politicians. Honest himself, Anant falls among the lower rungs of the police hierarchy and has very limited scope of authority on the state of affairs in his area.

When Anant arrests three common thugs, he is asked to meet with their boss, Rama Shetty (Sadashiv Amrapurkar), a don in the local mafia. Anant refuses all of Rama Shetty's attempts to get his men out or to entice Anant to join him. Shetty decides to watch over Anant.

Some time thereafter, a meek fellow from a local slum lodges a complaint about some ruffians who harass his wife. Anant finds them, locks them up, and administers a severe beating. As a fallout, the local MLA asks for Anant to be suspended.

Anant's boss, inspector Haider Ali, explains to a mystified Anant that the ruffians were the MLA's henchmen, providers of muscle during elections and political rallies. Anant is defiant with a clear conscience (he did nothing wrong) and ready to face a tribunal. Haider Ali explains that it will hardly get that far. Tribunals are either delayed indefinitely or are rigged (by corrupt politicians), and suspension during that time is a permanent black mark on one's record (for no other politician will be willing to deal with such a troublemaker).

Anant is initially baffled but goes along with Haider's plan to bring in Desai, a mediator or middle-man with connections in New Delhi, the "Centre" or national seat of power. Desai invokes higher powers to quietly cover up the matter. Anant's morals are shaken by this incident: He had to use means barely legal to uphold his righteous actions upon criminals.

Anant reflects upon his childhood. His father (Amrish Puri) retired as a Faujdar (constable) in the village police force. His father was a hard and violent man, quick to slap or beat his wife on the slightest pretext. Anant recalls looking on and being powerless to intervene. When Anant graduates college, he expresses his desire to pursue higher education but is forced into joining the police force.

Things get interesting when Anant finds one of Rama Shetty's goons, badly beaten, burnt and left to die. Anant brings the man into the hospital and takes his statement where he names Rama Shetty and others who inflicted this assault. Anant storms into Rama Shetty's rooms to arrest him. But Shetty is unfazed. He makes a simple phone call to a high ranking cop who immediately asks Anant to back off. Anant cites the context and the overwhelming evidence but is still ordered to step away. A consternated, resentful and hapless Anant leaves, feeling intensely humiliated.

Haider Ali explains yet again: Rama Shetty plans to run for city council in the upcoming municipal elections and simply cannot afford to let a petty matter distract his ambitions. Anant is horrified and enraged, and takes to drinking. His relationship with Jyotsna suffers. He is distraught when he is sent to provide security cover for Rama Shetty's campaign rallies.

He suffers another career setback when he leads an assault team to capture a dangerous bandit in the hills outside Mumbai, and the credit for the arrest is ultimately handed to another officer. His relationship deteriorates further and he takes to drinking fairly heavily. When Jyotsna confronts him, he confides in her.

Things go completely out of control one night soon after as a small-time thief, accused of stealing a small radio, is brought into custody. Anant is very drunk, angry and frustrated. He delivers a shocking and brutal beating to the thief – while continuing to drink – accusing him of "stealing the legitimate Rights of Others" {trans.: "Doosron ka haq churata hai, sala!"}.

Not surprisingly, the thief succumbs. The fallout leaves Anant suspended and facing charges of excessive force. Anant tries to invoke Desai again, but Haider Ali backs off, saying the situation has become too hot for most anyone. Haider Ali suggests, somewhat reluctantly, that perhaps the newly elected Rama Shetty can help.

After several days of deliberation, Anant decides to visit Rama Shetty in his betting den.

Rama Shetty receives Anant cordially, and invites him into his inner sanctum alone – possibly aware that this righteous cop is finally on his knees before him. He agrees to help him only if Anant, in return, joins forces with him. Anant breaks out of his 'impotent' torpor and, infuriated, in a stunning and violent move, strangles Rama Shetty there and then.

The film ends with Anant turning himself in.

Production
According to film expert Rajesh Subramanian, Amitabh Bachchan was first offered the lead role. The superstar, due to tight schedule, declined it. Om Puri was cast as Anant Welankar and it went on to become a career defining role.

Cast
 Om Puri as Sub-Inspector Anant Velankar
 Smita Patil as Jyotsna Gokhale
 Amrish Puri as  Police Constable Velankar, Anant's father
 Madhuri Purandare as Anant's mother
 Naseeruddin Shah as Suspended cop Mike Lobo
 Sadashiv Amrapurkar as Rama Shetty
 Madan Jain as Rama's Shetty son
 Shafi Inamdar as Police Inspector Hyder Ali
 Ila Arun as Sneha Vajpayee
 Satish Shah as Dacoit
 Achyut Potdar as Police Inspector Patil
Akash Khurana as Khanna, mill manager
Vijay Kashyap as Mill Union Leader
 K. K. Raina as restaurant owner
 Prabhakar Patankar as police officer Gupte
 Suresh Bhagwat as the complainant
 Shanta Gokhale as speaker at Lokshahi Hakka samiti meeting

Awards

|-
| rowspan="2"|1983
| rowspan="3"|Om Puri
| Best Actor – Karlovy Vary International Film Festival
| rowspan="2"
|-
| National Film Award for Best Actor 
|-
| rowspan="6"|1984
|Filmfare Award for Best Actor
|
|-
| Manmohan Shetty, Pradeep Uppoor
| Filmfare Award for Best Film
|rowspan="5"
|-
| Govind Nihalani
| Filmfare Award for Best Director
|-
| Sadashiv Amrapurkar
| Filmfare Award for Best Supporting Actor
|-
| S.D. Panvalkar
| Filmfare Award for Best Story
|-
| Vijay Tendulkar
| Filmfare Award for Best Screenplay
|-
|}

The existential crisis

In a pivotal scene, from which the movie derives its name, Jyotsna gives Anant a poem to read to him from a book that she is carrying, Ardh Satya (see below for transliteration). Anant begins to read the poem aloud; as the meaning sinks in, his smile vanishes; he continues reading in a more subdued and sombre tone. Filmed in a single long take, this is one of the finest moments world cinema has shown portraying the effect of art upon man in modern cinema (compare to Apres Nous). Later in the film, a cathartic moment occurs symbolising the poem, where Anant breaks down crying. Jyotsna reaches out a hand to comfort him but then withdraws it without touching him, in one of the most poignant moments of cinema; it is as if she realised that he is "within this Chakravyuh, or Circle of Deceit" alone and needs to find his inner strength to break out.

Govind Nihalani said in an interview on Indian TV after winning the National Award that the "moment" had actually occurred just before filming, during the rehearsal, where actor Om Puri broke down and started weeping openly while reciting this poem; Nihalani reached out a hand to comfort him and then withdrew it feeling that "his anguish was too monumental for a mere touch to provide any solace". He subsequently instructed Smita Patil to play the scene like this, giving her his futile gesture.

When faced with a moral or existential choice of such magnitude, man is essentially alone and another cannot partake of his anguish or lessen his burden. The movie suggests that Anant refuses to break out of his situation, choosing to stand and face his nothingness – to continue being an 'impotent' police officer, rather than give up his uniform and regain his manliness and self-efficacy.

The poem Ardh Satya

References

External links

 Review at NY Times

1983 films
1980s Hindi-language films
1983 drama films
Films featuring a Best Actor National Award-winning performance
Films about corruption in India
Fictional portrayals of the Maharashtra Police
Hindi films remade in other languages
Films scored by Ajit Varman
Films directed by Govind Nihalani
Films with screenplays by Vijay Tendulkar
Best Hindi Feature Film National Film Award winners
Films based on short fiction